Titãs are a Brazilian rock band from São Paulo. Though they basically play pop/alternative rock, their music has touched a number of other styles throughout their 30-year career, such as new wave, punk rock, grunge, MPB and electronic music.

They are one of the most successful rock bands in Brazil, having sold more than 6.3 million albums as of 2005 and having been covered by several well-known Brazilian artists and a couple of international singers. They were awarded a Latin Grammy in 2009 and have won the Imprensa Trophy for Best Band a record four times.

Titãs started with a rather unusual line-up of nine members (including six lead vocalists): Nando Reis (bass guitar, vocals), Branco Mello (vocals), Marcelo Fromer (Rhythm guitar), Arnaldo Antunes (vocals), Tony Bellotto (Lead guitar), Paulo Miklos (sax, mandolin, harmonica, vocals), André Jung (drums), Sérgio Britto (keyboards, vocals) and  Ciro Pessoa (vocals). Pessoa quickly left the band even before their debut album, Titãs, was released. André Jung was the initial drummer, but just after Titãs he also quit and was replaced by Charles Gavin, establishing their classic line-up.

Since then, the band lost five members who were never officially replaced: in 1992, Antunes left to pursue a solo career. In 2001, Fromer died after being hit by a motorcycle in São Paulo. In the next year, Reis also left the group to focus on his solo albums. In 2010, Gavin left due to personal reasons. The most recent change was the departure of Miklos, who wanted to focus on personal projects. After Fromer's death and Reis' departure, the band performed with some session guitarists and bassists, but ended up having Mello and Britto as full-time bassists (with Britto performing only when Mello sings) and Miklos as the rhythm guitarist. After Gavin left, the band has been working with Mario Fabre, a session drummer. For Miklos' position, they hired Rita Lee's son Beto Lee.

The band has released their latest studio album in 2018, titled Doze Flores Amarelas.

History

1981-1985: Formation and first works
Most of the band members (except for guitarist Tony Bellotto and drummer Charles Gavin) met at Colégio Equipe in São Paulo at the end of the seventies and, after their first live performance at the school itself in 1981, the band began to perform live in several night clubs around the city. Their very first performance was at the Mário de Andrade Library - on that occasion, Nando Reis played the drums. The first lineup was: Arnaldo Antunes (vocals), Branco Mello (vocals), Marcelo Fromer (rhythm guitar), Nando Reis (bass guitar), Paulo Miklos (sax and vocals), Sérgio Britto (keyboards and vocals), Tony Bellotto (lead guitar), Ciro Pessoa (vocals) and André Jung (drums). It was a pop/new wave-styled band, with a rather conventional sound and odd looks, with tender and little ball neckties.

The band's name has its roots in their early sessions, at Bellotto's parent's home library, where there were books such as Titãs da Ciência, Titãs do Esporte, Titãs da Literatura (Science Titans, Sports Titans, Literature Titans), among others, and that inspired them to create the name Titãs do Iê Iê. Their first shows happened on 15 and 16 October 1982, at Sesc Pompeia.

In 1984, Pessoa left the band, unwilling to exchange the local night clubs for popular TV shows. Soon after, the band signed with the WEA label to record their first album, Titãs, produced by Pena Schimdt, and featuring songs previously recorded with Pessoas's vocals. Although poorly promoted and hardly a success, the band spawned their first hit: "Sonífera Ilha", later recorded by singer Moraes Moreira. Following the release, Reis briefly left the band, willing to focus on another group he played at (salsa act Sossega Leão, in which he was a percussionist and crooner), but two weeks later he changed his mind and was accepted back.

In 1985, with Charles Gavin replacing André Jung on drums (the latter going on to Ira!), their second album, Televisão, produced by Lulu Santos, was released with tighter arrangements than their debut album. Not only was the title track a great hit, the album was more heavily promoted than the first one and brought more opportunities to the group. Still, it sold below expectations.

1985-1989: Into the spotlight 
In November 1985, Tony Bellotto and Arnaldo Antunes were arrested for heroin traffic and transportation. It is considered by the band as the climax of their first crisis, started with the first two albums low sales. Also, the episode made so much of an impact in the band that the next album, Cabeça Dinossauro, released in June 1986, contained a lot of tracks criticizing public institutions ("Estado Violência" and "Polícia"), as well as other "pillars" of the Brazilian society and indeed society in general ("Igreja" and "Família"). The heavy and punk-influenced rhythms and the forceful lyrics, characteristic of the band in this phase, are fully represented in this album which is considered by the critics one of the best works of the group and one of the landmarks of the Brazilian rock.

Jesus não Tem Dentes no País dos Banguelas, released in the end of 1987, continued in the same vein as the previous album in tracks like "Nome aos Bois", "Lugar Nenhum" and "Desordem", however adding samplers in tracks like "Corações e Mentes", "Todo Mundo quer Amor", "Comida" and "Diversão". After some international performances, the band recorded some of their hits in live Montreux Festival and released Go Back in 1988. The biggest hit to come out of Go Back was a live version of the song "Marvin" which is a re-invented version of "Patches" by Clarence Carter made famous by Elvis. Still in 1988, they guest performed on the song "Tempo" (written by Antunes and Miklos) of Sandra de Sá's 1988 self-titled album.

The producer Liminha (a former adjunct member of Os Mutantes) was always an important associate of the band since Cabeça Dinossauro, and this association arrived to its climax in Õ Blésq Blom (1989), one of the most popular productions of the band by that time. Some of the prominence tracks: "Miséria", "Flores", "O Pulso" and "32 Dentes". One of the prominent features of this work was the special guest appearance of a couple of improvisors, called Mauro and Quitéria, discovered by the band at a beach in Recife.

1990-1995: Antunes' departure and Jack Endino era 
The band had arrived to a decisive point in its history and the next album, Tudo ao Mesmo Tempo Agora marks a strong yaw at the musicians' style, searching for heavier, alternative and authorial sound, along with scatological lyrics. The members themselves produced the album.

Unhappy with the new direction taken by the band, Antunes left for a solo career on 15 December 1992, although he would continue to write occasional songs with them. The following album, Titanomaquia, in 1993, continued the previous work in a way, with heavy instrumentation and aggressive lyrics, only now produced by Jack Endino, producer of important bands like Nirvana, which contributed for the grunge-influenced sound.

In 1995 the band decided to take a break for one year during which many of its members decided to work solo. Miklos and Reis released their debut solo efforts, Paulo Miklos and 12 de Janeiro, respectively; Britto and Mello formed Kleiderman; and Bellotto wrote his first book, Bellini e a Esfinge.

The band released Domingo in the end of 1995, again with production by Endino.

1997-1999: Acoustic and tribute efforts 

The band's commercial peak was reached once they released the commemorative work Acústico MTV (MTV Unplugged), their most successful album to date, released in 1997, which sold 1,7 million copies. Recorded Live, Acústico MTV not only revisited their career up to that point but it also had a song which became an immediate hit named "Pra dizer Adeus" (originally from Televisão). It also had a number of guest performers, including former member Arnaldo Antunes.

This record was followed by Volume Dois (1998), modeled in the same way of their unplugged album, only recorded in studio; and cover album As Dez Mais (1999), which didn't sell well and was panned by critics, despite "Aluga-se" and "Pelados em Santos" becoming hits.

Also in 1999, the band embarked on a collaborative tour with Os Paralamas do Sucesso, another successful Brazilian rock band, and a live, collaborative record followed: Titãs & Paralamas Juntos ao Vivo.

2001-2009: Fromer's death, Reis' departure, documentary and Latin Grammy 
On 11 June 2001 Marcelo Fromer was rammed by a motorcycle in São Paulo and died two days later of Brain death. It was a hard stroke to the band, which started recording their new album the day after. A Melhor Banda de Todos os Tempos da Última Semana was released at the end of 2001 and brought "Epitáfio" as the prominence song and the title track as the first single.

Regarding the death of Marcelo, this statement was published on 20 June 2001 at Titãs official site:

In the following year, the band saw the departure of vocalist and bassist Nando Reis, who has since lead a successful solo career (including songs penned for other artists) fronting his own band Nando Reis e os Infernais. He announced his parting on 9 September 9, 2002, giving "thought incompatibility" as a reason and also saying Fromer's and his close friend Cássia Eller's deaths left him very upset:

In a 2012 interview, he would say he didn't feel ready for the studio following his friends' deaths and three consecutive, exhausting tours.

The band hired the bass guitarist Lee Marcucci (from Rádio Táxi) to play in their first album without Reis, Como Estão Vocês? (How Are You?). With self-help hits as "Enquanto Houver Sol", questions on relevance remain on Titãs' side, which faced declining sales and the ageing of their fanbase.

In 2005, they released another MTV-branded album, only this time in a non-acoustic live performance. This album generated a new hit for the group, called "Vossa Excelência", that basically criticizes the hypocrisy and lack of care from politicians, thus bringing the band back to its roots.

On 18 February 2006, Titãs opened the Rolling Stones free concert at Copacabana beach, Rio de Janeiro for an audience of some 1.5 million people.

In 2007, the band started a tour, entitled 25 Anos de Rock (25 Years of Rock), again joining Os Paralamas do Sucesso to celebrate the 25th anniversary of both bands, as well as the 25th anniversary of the rising of 1980s Brazilian rock bands. The two line-ups played together most of the time on the shows, presenting also some invited musicians, like Arnaldo Antunes, Andreas Kisser and Dado Villa-Lobos. The concert in Rio de Janeiro, which took place on 26 January 2008, was recorded and filmed. The resulting collaborative CD and DVD were released five months after, titled Paralamas e Titãs Juntos e Ao Vivo .

The band released a documentary of the 25 years of their career. The documentary features 90 minutes of images collected since the beginning of the band, including recording of albums, live performances, and more. It is titled Titãs - A Vida Até Parece Uma Festa.

For most of 2008 and early 2009, the band recorded their 13th studio album, the Latin Grammy-winner Sacos Plásticos. The album was released on 3 June 2009, through Arsenal Music. The producer, Rick Bonadio, had already worked with artists such as Fresno and NX Zero.

The first single from the album was "Antes de Você" ("Before You"), and it received radio airplay on 7 May. It was featured at the Caras & Bocas (current 19pm Rede Globo telenovela) soundtrack. The second single was "Porque Eu Sei que É Amor" (Because I Know It's Love) which was featured in Cama de Gato (a Brazilian telenovela that also features the song "Pelo Avesso" as opening theme, from their 2003 album Como Estão Vocês?) and reached #16 at Brasil Hot 100 Airplay

In an interview to Jornal da Tarde, and regarding the music of the new album, Bonadio stated:

2010-2016: Gavin's departure, 30th birthday, Nheengatu 

On 12 February 2010, Titãs announced in their official website that drummer Charles Gavin would leave the band for personal reasons. Gavin later stated that he was physically and mentally exhausted because of the tours and album releases. The quartet continued their performances of the Sacos Plásticos tour with drummer Mario Fabre, who has remained with the band since then as a session member. Fabre was suggested by Gavin himself. When asked about the status of Fabre in the band, Bellotto explained that "he is the official drummer! He's the drummer of Titãs! But he isn't one of Titãs, because our history began long ago, at Greek mythology... "

During an interview, keyboardist Sérgio Britto said the band was planning to start recording a new album in 2011. Nothing else was said since then, until March 2013, when they revealed they were starting to work on a new album, to be released in the second half of 2013. The album would be self-produced, and, according to Britto, it would be "a mixture between Cabeça Dinossauro and Õ Blésq Blom".

In January 2012, the band announced a live performance in company of ex-members Arnaldo Antunes, Nando Reis and Charles Gavin. The show would celebrate the 30-year career of the band, and would include guest performances of other friends of the band, and there were plans for a DVD release. According to Miklos:

The reunion took place on 6 October 2012, in São Paulo. For the first time since 1997's Acústico MTV, the seven original members of the band reunited for a one-night performance. According to Bellotto:

The band gathered in Reis' house to discuss the reunion - it was the first time since Fromer's death that all seven members met.

In 2013, Titãs performed new songs live, part of their Titãs Inédito (Titãs Unseen) tour. They were planning to begin work on a new album in April or May 2014. Miklos said the album was likely to be "heavy, dirty and mean". Later, Britto confirmed that the album would be released in early May and that the band was already recording songs for it, but it was yet to be titled. In March, radio Globo FM announced that the album would be actually released in April and would feature 14 tracks. On 16 April, the band announced that the album was ready and would be really released in May, via Som Livre records. On 28 April, they announced the title, cover and release date for the album, which is called Nheengatu and was released on 12 May. In August 2015, they released Nheengatu ao Vivo, a live album and DVD with songs from their Nheengatu Tour.

In February 2016, they opened a Rolling Stones Brazilian show for a second and third time, this time at the Morumbi Stadium in São Paulo, on two different dates.

2016-2018: Miklos' departure and rock opera 
On 11 July 2016, vocalist, guitarist and founding member Paulo Miklos announced he would leave the band to focus on his personal projects. He was then replaced by session member Beto Lee, son of Brazilian notorious rock singer Rita Lee.

His first recording with the band is a version of "Pro Dia Nascer Feliz", originally by Barão Vermelho, for the soundtrack of the 24th season of Malhação, a Rede Globo series. With Lee's inclusion, the band recovered some old songs for its live setlists, including Titanomaquia's "Será Que É Disso Que Eu Necessito?" and "Nem Sempre se Pode Ser Deus". They also started to have Bellotto sing in some songs.

Also in 2016, the band announced a new album for a possible 2017 release. According to Bellotto, it would be a rock opera, and the band intended to enter the studio until mid-2017 so the album could be released in the year's second half. Drawing inspiration from albums such as The Who's Quadrophenia and Green Day's American Idiot, the over 30-track rock opera would have its story written by Hugo Possolo and Marcelo Rubens Paiva. By April 2017, Mello said a handful of tracks were ready.

Also in April, the band started a tour called "Uma Noite no Teatro" (A Night at the Theater) with a show that was also the inaugurating event of Shopping Villa-Lobos' theater Opus. The tour included three new songs: "Me Estuprem" (Rape Me), about sexual harassment and rape; "12 Flores Amarelas" (12 Yellow Flowers); and "A Festa" (The Party). By that time, none of them were expected to be featured in the band's new album. On 23 September, however, the band performed them again during their show at the Rock in Rio 7, and this time they were announced as part of the new project. In December 2017, they announced that they had already started recording the album and that it would be released via Universal Music. On 31 January, they announced that the opera rock would be released in early 2018 and that its title would be Doze Flores Amarelas.

In May 2018, after the Doze Flores Amarelas DVD had been recorded, Mello was diagnosed with a tumor in his larynx, which forced him to step down from the band activities for three months. Lee Marcucci, who worked for the band as a session musician from 2002 to 2009, stepped in to replace him.

2018-present: Titãs Trio Acústico, return to BMG 
From 2019 on, they did a series of acoustic shows in order to celebrate 20 years of Acústico MTV, which wasn't possible in 2017 since they were focusin on Doze Flores Amarelas. The tour was named "Trio Acústico" ("Acoustic Trio") and was conciliated with the Doze Flores Amarelas promotional tour and a third tour called "Enquanto Houver Sol", this one in an electric format and involving songs from many eras of the group.

In 2020, the band announced it had recorded a studio version of the project and that it would be released as three EPs, under the collective title Titãs Trio Acústico. A re-recording of "Sonífera Ilha" was released as a single and video on 20 March, when it was also announced that the EPs would be released starting in April via BMG, the label to which then returned by the end of 2019.

On 5 May 2020, original founding member Ciro Pessoa died following complications from a cancer and COVID-19.

In October 2020, the remaining members were featured in a cover of "Comida" (from Jesus não Tem Dentes no País dos Banguelas) released by singer Elza Soares. The version was originally planned for her 2019 album Planeta Fome, but she chose to save the song for later and decided to release it at the album's first anniversary and also to celebrate its nomination for the Latin Grammy Award.

In January 2022, former member Nando Reis said he has rejected for now the possibility of taking part in the band's 40th anniversary tour, due to him having "one idea" and them "another".

Members 
Current
 Branco Mello – lead and backing vocals (1981–present, on hiatus: 2018); bass (2002–present, in some tracks: 2002–2009, in most tracks: 2009–present, on hiatus: 2018); acoustic guitar on unplugged shows (2016–present, on hiatus: 2018)
 Sérgio Britto – keyboards, piano, organ, synthesizer, mellotron, lead and backing vocals (1981–present); bass on tracks sung by Mello (2009–present); acoustic guitar (2016–present)
 Tony Bellotto – lead, rhythm, acoustic, slide, wah-wah, 6 and 12-string guitar (1981–present); occasional backing and lead vocals (2016–present)

Past
 Paulo Miklos – lead and backing vocals, saxophone, mandolin, banjo, harmonica, occasional keyboards and bass (1981–2016); rhythm, lead and acoustic guitar (occasionally: 1981–2001, full-time: 2001–2016, in some tracks only: 2001–2009, in all tracks: 2009–2016)
 Charles Gavin – drums, percussion (1985–2010)
 Nando Reis – bass, backing and lead vocals, occasional acoustic guitar (1981–2002)
 Marcelo Fromer – rhythm, lead and acoustic guitar (1981–2001; his death)
 Arnaldo Antunes – lead and backing vocals (1981–1992)
 André Jung – drums (1981–1985)
 Ciro Pessoa – backing and lead vocals (1981–1984; died 2020)

Touring and session musicians
 Beto Lee – rhythm and lead guitar, backing vocals (2016–present)
 Mario Fabre – drums (2010–present)
 Lee Marcucci – bass (2002–2009 touring and session; 2018 as substitute)
 André Fonseca – rhythm and lead guitar, backing vocals (2007–2009 touring only)
 Emerson Villani – rhythm and lead guitar, backing vocals (1998 touring only, 2001–2007 touring and session)

Timeline

Discography 

Titãs (1984)
Televisão (1985)
Cabeça Dinossauro (1986)
Jesus não Tem Dentes no País dos Banguelas (1987)
Õ Blésq Blom (1989)
Tudo ao Mesmo Tempo Agora (1991)
Titanomaquia (1993)
Domingo (1995)
Acústico MTV (1997)
Volume Dois (1998)
As Dez Mais (1999)
A Melhor Banda de Todos os Tempos da Última Semana (2001)
Como Estão Vocês? (2003)
Sacos Plásticos (2009)
Nheengatu (2014)
Doze Flores Amarelas (2018)
Titãs Trio Acústico (2020)
Olho Furta-Cor (2022)

Awards 
 Latin Grammy Award – "Best Brazilian Rock Album" with Sacos Plásticos (2009))
 Troféu Imprensa – "Best band" (1987, 1988, 1997, 1998) and "Best song" ("Pra Dizer Adeus", 1997)
 Prêmio Bizz (by Revista Bizz) – "Best album" (Cabeça Dinossauro (1986), Jesus Não Tem Dentes No País Dos Banguelas (1987), Õ Blésq Blom (1989), Volume Dois (1998)) "Best band" (1987, 1988, 1989, 1997, 1998), and "Best show" (Titãs – Volume 2 – Ao Vivo, 1998)
 Prêmio Multishow de Música Brasileira (by Multishow) – "Best band" (1998, 1999, 2002), "Best album" (Titãs – Acústico MTV (1998), Volume Dois (1999)), "Best show" (Titãs – Acústico MTV, 1998), "Best song" (É Preciso Saber Viver, 1999) and "Best instrumentalist" (Tony Bellotto, 2000)
 MTV Video Music Brasil – "Best videoclip" (Flores (1990), Será Que é Disso Que eu Necessito? (1993), "Best rock clip", "Best Rock Video", "Video Of The Year" and "Viewer's Choice" (Epitáfio, 2002), "Musical Movie/Documentary of the Year" (Titãs – A Vida Até Parece Uma Festa, 2009)
 TIM Music Award Best band (Pop/Rock category) (2004)

References

External links 

   
 Official English website (by Jack Endino) 

 
Brazilian rock music groups
Musical groups established in 1982
Musical groups from São Paulo
Hollywood Records artists
Warner Music Group artists
Sony BMG artists
Brazilian punk rock groups
Latin Grammy Award winners
Musical quartets
1982 establishments in Brazil